The Haringvliet sluices are a construction that closed off the estuary of the Haringvliet, Netherlands, as part of the Delta Works. The structure consists of 17 sluices, several kilometres of dam and a shipping lock.

The northernmost of the Delta Works, it was supposed to be finished by 1968 as the first part of the project. Building started in 1957 and was finished in 1971. Instead of damming the estuary it was decided to  build sluices in order to be able to let in salt water to prevent freezing of the rivers Meuse and Rhine and to drain these rivers in case of flood.

The sluices have two doors each of which the door on the sea side is the lowest. This has been done to mitigate the effect of the waves on the doors and the construction.

There are plans to open several sluices permanently, resulting in the estuary function of the Haringvliet being restored. This will be done in order to improve the ecological situation in the river Meuse and Rhine. It will allow the return of brackish water (with the associated flora and fauna) and will restore the main route for migrating fish. It will also result in a minor return of the tides in areas like Tiengemeten and the Biesbosch, both important nature reserves.

References

External links

Haringvliet Dam

Delta Works
Dams completed in 1971
Dams in South Holland
Goeree-Overflakkee
Voorne-Putten
Buildings and structures in Voorne aan Zee